The Kilopondmetre is an obsolete unit of torque and energy in the gravitational metric system. It is abbreviated kp·m or m·kp, older publications often use m­kg and kg­m as well.

Torque is a product of the length of a lever and the force applied to the lever. One kilopond is the force applied to one kilogram due to gravitational acceleration; this force is exactly 9.80665 N.
This means 1 kp·m = 9.80665 kg·m/s2 = 9.80665 N·m.

References 

Units of torque
Units of energy
Non-SI metric units